The Lacetani were an ancient Iberian (pre-Roman) people of the Iberian peninsula (the Roman Hispania). They are believed to have spoken an Iberian language.

See also
Iberians
Pre-Roman peoples of the Iberian Peninsula

External links
Lacetans
Detailed map of the Pre-Roman Peoples of Iberia (around 200 BC)

Pre-Roman peoples of the Iberian Peninsula
History of Catalonia
Ancient peoples of Spain